Timur Mukhamedkhanov (born 13 October 1971) is a Uzbekistani judoka. He competed in the men's half-lightweight event at the 1996 Summer Olympics.

References

1971 births
Living people
Uzbekistani male judoka
Olympic judoka of Uzbekistan
Judoka at the 1996 Summer Olympics
Place of birth missing (living people)